Kuvango or Cuvango is a town and municipality in the province of Huíla, Angola. The municipality had a population of 78,543 in 2014.

It is served by a station on the southern line of the national railway system.

References 

Populated places in Huíla Province
Municipalities of Angola